Lulu is an unincorporated community in Columbia County, Florida, United States.

History
A post office called Lulu was established in 1891, and remained in operation until being discontinued in 1976. Lulu was the name of the first postmaster's love interest.

References

Unincorporated communities in Columbia County, Florida
Unincorporated communities in Florida